The South West Line of Chennai Suburban Railway is the sixth longest suburban line that runs south-west from Chennai (Madras) City.

Sections

Beach — Tambaram
 This section has 2 dedicated lines for the suburban train operations apart from 2 main lines for mixed traffic.
 EMUs are operated along 3rd and 4th main lines during peak hours.
 12-car EMU are operated in this sector.

Tambaram — Chengalpattu
 This section has 2 dedicated lines for the suburban trains operations apart from 1 main line for mixed traffic
 4th line is planned.
 12-car EMU are operated in this sector.

Chengalpattu — Kanchipuram — Arakkonam
 This section has decidated 1 line for the suburban trains and mixed traffic
 2nd line is planned 
 12-Car EMU is operated in this sector 

Chennai Suburban Railway